Luciano Rigolini (born 2 August 1950) is a Swiss artist, photographer, bookmaker, producer and former commissioning editor at Arte in Paris.

Life and work
He studied cinema but soon turned to photography.

In 1995 he joined the documentary unit of the European television channel Arte in Paris, where he was responsible for creative author film development until 2015. He produced films by filmmakers such as Chris Marker, Alexandre Sokourov, Naomi Kawase, Chantal Akerman, Apichatpong Weerasethakul, Tsai Ming-liang, Laurie Anderson. He is the author for Arte of Collection Photo, 12 documentaries on the history of photography from its origins to today with the scientific collaboration of Quentin Bajac.

Since 2002 he has been working in photography exclusively through appropriation and rereading of amateur images and industrial documents. His work is also expressed through several author's books. Parr and Badger include Surrogates (2012) in the third volume of their photobook history. They write: "In Surrogates, he has taken as his source imagery spare parts for vintage cars available for sale on eBay. He then retouches and greatly enlarges them, presenting them on plain or colour-field backgrounds so that they become re-contextualized as formal images, stripped from their former function". Private/Used (2013) is a book of photographs of women in lingerie, selling their used underwear on eBay. Mask (2015) is a collection of grilles of cars made in Detroit between 1955 and 1962.

He taught Cinema and Photography in several Universities, including the Rice University of Houston, the Sci-Arc (Southern California Institute of Architecture), the Head (Geneva University of Art and Design)
 and the Documentary Master of the Pompeu Fabra University in Barcelona.

Publications
Luciano Rigolini: Fotografie '90–'92. Lugano: , 1992. . Catalog of an exhibition held at the Museo Cantonale d'Arte, Lugano, 1992/93. German and Italian.
Luciano Rigolini: Città aperta-Open City, Photographs 1990-1995. Catalog, Houston: Farish Gallery, Rice University School of Architecture, 1995.
Une Tour. Paris: Edition Textuel, 2001. .
Ritmo 04. Museo Cantonale d’Arte, 2004.
La forma dello sguardo. Mendrisio Academy Press, 2007. .
What you see. Fotostiftung Schweiz and Lars Müller publisher, 2008. .
Another image. Skira, 2011. .
Surrogates. Paris: Centre Culturel Suisse; Lausanne: Musée de l'Elysée, 2012. .
Private/Used. Zurich: Patrick Frey, 2013. .
Mask. Zurich: Patrick Frey, 2015. .
AS 15-16. Zurich: Patrick Frey, 2018. .
Inexplicata Volantes. Tokyo: Akio Nagasawa Publishing, 2022.

Exhibitions

Solo exhibitions
Luciano Rigolini: Fotografie ’90–’92, Lugano, 1992
Luciano Rigolini, Città aperta-Open City, Photographs 1990-1995, Farish Gallery, Rice University School of Architecture, Houston, 1995
Luciano RIgolini. Photographs 1990-1995, Foto Forum, St. Gallen, 1996
, Winterthur, 2008
Luciano Rigolini. Another image, Max Museo-Spazio Officina, Chiasso, 2011.
Surrogates, Centre Culturelle Suisse, Paris, 2012
Luciano Rigolini, Concept Car, Musée de l’Elysée, Lausanne, 2012-13.
Luciano Rigolini – Landscape, Buchmann Art Galerie, Lugano, 2015.

Group exhibitions
La fotografia contemporanea della collezione Gernsheim, Magazzini del sale, Venezia, e Roemer-Museum, Hildesheim, 1995
Architecture in black and white, Kunst- und Austellungshalle, der Bundesrepublik Deutschland, Bonn, 1997
Il San Gottardo come arteria, Galleria Gottardo, Lugano, 1997
Icons: magnets of meaning, San Francisco Museum of Modern Art, 1997
Zürich-Ein Fotoprtrait, Kunsthaus Zürich, 1997
Fondation Cartier pour l'Art Contemporain, Paris, 2017
Fotografia Europea-European Photography, Galleria Gottardo, Reggio Emilia, 2017
Pendulum. Moving goods, moving people, Fondazione Mast, Bologna, 2018
Moonstruck: Photographic Explorations, Fotostiftung Schweiz, Winterthur, 2019

Films
Documenta 7 (1982) – director; about Documenta 7
Portraits, 10 Swiss Artists Today (1987) – director
The worlds of silence (2001) – director (with Silvana Bezzola)
Naomi Kawase, Kya ka ra ba (2001) – commissioning editor Arte France
Angela Ricci Lucchi, Yervant Gianikian, Images d’orient-Tourisme vandale (2001) – commissioning editor Arte France
Alexandre Sokourov, Elegie de la traversée (2001) – commissioning editor Arte France
Serguei Dvortsevoi, In the dark (2002) – commissioning editor Arte France
Avi Mograbi, August, A moment before the eruption (2002) – commissioning editor Arte France
Chantal Akerman, De l’autre côté (2002) – commissioning editor Arte France
Chris Marker, Chats Perches (2004) – commissioning editor Arte France
David Teboul, Bania (2005) – commissioning editor Arte France
Lech Kowalski, East of paradise (2005) – commissioning editor Arte France
Naomi Kawase, Tarachime (2006) – commissioning editor Arte France
Naomi Kawase, Chiri (2012) – commissioning editor Arte France
Apichatpong Weerasethakul, Mekong Hotel (2012) – commissioning editor Arte France
Photo l’Integrale. Les Gands courants Photographiques, Une collection documentaire proposée par Luciano Rigolini, Arte France Editions, Paris (2009-2013)
Tsai Ming-linag, Walker-Journey to the west (2014) – commissioning editor Arte France
Laurie Anderson, Heart of a dog (2015) – commissioning editor Arte France
Innocence of Memories (2015) – executive producer

References 

21st-century Swiss photographers
Living people
1950 births